Nahoo 3 – Notes from the Republic is the third album by Scottish musician Paul Mounsey released in 1999 (See 1999 in music).

Track listing
"Nahoo Nation"
"Independence Blues"
"The Keening"
"Notes From the Rupublic"
"Unfinished Business"
"Don Roberto's Sabbath"
"Night Falls"
"Mad Litany"
"Carver Angus with Bites"
"The First Time Ever I Saw Your Face"
"Reel Slow"
"Taking Leave"
"Fiunary"
"Last Thoughts"

1999 albums
Paul Mounsey albums